Beyond the Purple Hills is a 1950 American Western film directed by John English and written by Norman S. Hall. The film stars Gene Autry, Jo-Carroll Dennison, Don Beddoe, James Millican, Don Reynolds and Hugh O'Brian. The film was released on July 25, 1950, by Columbia Pictures.

Plot
When a bank robbery results in the death of the sheriff, Judge Beaumont (Roy Gordon) asks horse trainer Gene Autry (Gene Autry) to take the sheriff's place. Gene, who has helped Beaumont deal with his fractious son, Jack (Hugh O'Brian), agrees. Beaumont then reveals that he wants to rewrite his will to leave Jack out, prompting a fight between father and son. When the judge is murdered soon after, Gene is forced to arrest Jack, despite not believing that he is guilty.

Cast
Gene Autry as Gene Autry
Jo-Carroll Dennison as Mollie Rayburn
Don Beddoe as Amos Rayburn
James Millican as Rocky Morgan
Don Reynolds as Chip Beaumont
Hugh O'Brian as Jack Beaumont
Roy Gordon as Judge Beaumont
Harry Harvey Sr. as Sheriff Whiteside
Pat Buttram as Mike Rawley
Gregg Barton as Ross Pardee
Robert J. Wilke as Jim Connors
Ralph Peters as Tim
Frank Ellis as Corey
John Cliff as Dave Miller
Sandy Sanders as Doghouse
Frankie Marvin as Marty
Boyd Stockman as Ed
Maudie Prickett as Aggie
Champion the Wonder Horse as Champ

References

External links
 

1950 films
American Western (genre) films
1950 Western (genre) films
Columbia Pictures films
Films directed by John English
American black-and-white films
1950s English-language films
1950s American films